Dan Gillerman (born 1944 in Tel Aviv) was Israel's 13th Permanent Representative to the United Nations. He was appointed in July 2002 and assumed his post on January 1, 2003, serving through 2008.

Education 
Gillerman was educated at Whittinghame College, a Jewish boarding school in Brighton, England, and studied politics, economics and law at Tel Aviv University and the Hebrew University of Jerusalem.

Career 
Gillerman served as the CEO of several Israeli companies, Chairman of the Federation of Israeli Chambers of Commerce, member of the board of the First International Bank of Israel and Director of Bank Leumi and the Bank of Israel. He also served on the Prime Minister's National Economic and Social Council, the President's Committee of the Coordinating Council of Israel's Economic Organizations, as Chairman of the Israel-British Business Council, and as member of the executive board of the International Chamber of Commerce of the World Business Organization.

Gillerman has played a prominent role in helping steer Israel towards economic liberalization and a free market economy. He is actively engaged in the economic aspects of the peace process and has engaged Palestinian and other Arab leaders in an attempt to further economic cooperation within the region.

On June 14, 2005, he was elected to the position of Vice-President of the 60th UN General Assembly. The last Israeli to hold this position was UN envoy Abba Eban in 1952. Israel's candidacy was put forward by the United Nations Western Europe and Others Group (WEOG). In this position, Gillerman played a central role during the initial negotiation stages of the 2006 Israel-Lebanon conflict.

On April 24, 2008, Gillerman referred to former US President Jimmy Carter as a bigot for his meeting in Syria with Hamas leader Khaled Meshaal.

See also
Israel and the United Nations

References

External links
Satirical Interview with Dan Gillerman on The Daily Show (aired April 10, 2007).

1944 births
Living people
People from Tel Aviv
Hebrew University of Jerusalem alumni